Oakdale is a hamlet (and census-designated place) in Suffolk County, New York, United States. The population was 7,974 at the 2010 census.  Oakdale is in the Town of Islip. It has been home to Gilded Age mansions, the South Side Sportsmen's Club, and the main campus of Dowling College. It is now home to Connetquot River State Park Preserve.

History 

Oakdale was founded around two Native American trade routes, where Sunrise Highway and Montauk Highway currently lie. Oakdale was part of the royal land grant given to William Nicoll, who founded Islip Town in 1697. Local historian Charles P. Dickerson wrote in 1975 that Oakdale's name appeared to come from a Nicoll descendant in the mid-19th century. The community includes: St. John's Episcopal Church, built in 1765, is the third oldest church on Long Island.

The community originated with a tavern owned by Eliphalet (Liff) Snedecor in what is now Connetquot River State Park Preserve. Soon after its founding in 1820, Snedecor's Tavern began drawing New York bluebloods and business barons who wined and dined in remote joy when they weren't fishing and hunting nearby. "Liff's food is as good as his creek", a magazine writer declared in 1839 referring to the food and Connetquot River. The writer added:  "and the two are only second to his mint juleps and champagne punch; whoever gainsays either fact deserves hanging without benefit of clergy."

In 1866, as the railroad reached the area, Liff's wealthy patrons formed the South Side Sportsmen's Club, and soon the race was on to see who could create the most superb spread in the thick forests adjoining Great South Bay. The most prominent were built by William K. Vanderbilt, grandson of railroad magnate Cornelius Vanderbilt; Frederick G. Bourne, president of the Singer Sewing Machine Co., and Christopher Robert II, an eccentric heir to a sugar fortune. Meanwhile, William Bayard Cutting, a lawyer, financier and railroad man, built his estate next door in Great River, New York which had once been west Oakdale.

In 1912, Jacob Ockers of Oakdale organized the Bluepoint Oyster Co., which became the largest oyster producer and shipper in the country.

Gilded Age estates
Gilded Age estates were a feature of Oakdale's past toward the end of the 19th century and into the early 20th century.

Idle Hour
In 1882, William Kissam Vanderbilt built the most noted one, Idle Hour,  on the Connetquot River. The lavish, wooden 110-room home was destroyed by fire on April 15, 1899, while his son, Willie K. II, was honeymooning there. Willie and his new wife escaped. It was promptly rebuilt of red brick and gray stone, with exquisite furnishings, for $3 million. The building at the time was considered among the finest homes in America. His daughter Consuelo had also honeymooned there when she married the Duke of Marlborough in 1895.

After Vanderbilt's death in 1920, the mansion went through several phases and visitors, including a brief stay during Prohibition by gangster Dutch Schultz. Around that time, cow stalls, pig pens and corn cribs on the farm portion of Idle Hour were converted into a short-lived bohemian artists' colony that included figures such as George Elmer Browne and Roman (Bon) Bonet-Sintas as well as sculptress Catherine Lawson, costume designer Olga Meervold, and pianist Claude Govier, and Francis Gow-Smith and his wife Carol. The estate was most recently the home of Dowling College, a struggling school which closed in August 2016.

Pepperidge Hall
By 1888, Christopher R. Robert II (son of Christopher Robert) built a spectacular castle just east of Idle Hour called Pepperidge Hall,  furnished in the French style for his wife. But the pair didn't get along. On January 2, 1898, she told police she found Robert shot to death in his Manhattan apartment. It was ruled suicide and she moved to Paris. The mansion featured in silent movies 1916-1920, fell into disrepair and was razed in 1941.

Indian Neck Hall
In 1897, Frederick Gilbert Bourne, who began with  but later owned land reaching to West Sayville, completed his mansion, Indian Neck Hall, on the east side of Oakdale. Bourne was active locally, as commodore of the Sayville Yacht Club, and was generous to the local fire department. The eastern part of his estate now comprises the West Sayville County Golf Course and the Long Island Maritime Museum, while much of the middle portion is developed with homes. Bourne died in 1920. Six years later the mansion, on the western end, became the site of La Salle Military Academy, operated by the Christian Brothers, a Catholic order. In 1993, the brothers converted the academy into a kindergarten-through-high-school "global learning community". In 2001, La Salle was closed and it was bought by St. John's University of New York.

Geography
Oakdale is located at  (40.739858, -73.139696).

Demographics

As of the 2020 United States Census, there were 7,430 people and 2,717 households residing in the CDP. The racial makeup of the CDP was 88.3% White, 6.4% African American, 0.6% Asian, 0.3% from other races, and 4.4% from two or more races. Hispanic or Latino of any race were 4.7% of the population.

In the CDP, the population was spread out, with 14.7% under the age of 18, 4.3% under the age of five, and 24.1% who were 65 years of age or older. 

The median income for a household in the CDP was $112,464, while the per capita income for the CDP was $54,058. About 6.3% of the population were below the poverty line.

Notable people
 William Kissam Vanderbilt
 William Kissam Vanderbilt II
 Consuelo Vanderbilt
 Harold Stirling Vanderbilt
 Alva Erskine Smith
 Frederick Gilbert Bourne
 Michael Carbonaro
 Dutch Schultz, gangster
 Jane Monheit
 Jimmy McNeece
 Tom McNeece
 Ginny Fields
 Mike Pellegrino

References

External links
 The Snapper Inn - Fine Dining on the Connetquot River
 Dowling College
 St. John's University: Oakdale Campus
 Oakdale, NY
 Oakdale Community web site

Islip (town), New York
Census-designated places in New York (state)
Hamlets in New York (state)
Artist colonies
St. John's University (New York City)
Populated places established in 1820
1820 establishments in New York (state)
Census-designated places in Suffolk County, New York
Hamlets in Suffolk County, New York
Populated coastal places in New York (state)